The 2018 RFL Women's Challenge Cup was an English rugby league knockout tournament competed for by 21 teams during the summer of 2018.  The competition was won by Leeds Rhinos who beat Castleford Tigers 20–14 in the final at the Halliwell Jones Stadium on 4 August 2018.

First round
The first round ties were played in early May.

Second round
The second round ties were all played on 3 June.  The shock result of the round was the home defeat of the cup holders, Bradford Bulls, by newly formed team Castleford Tigers.

Quarter-finals
The draw for the quarter-finals of the Cup were made on 6 June.  Ties were played on 1 July.

Semi-finals
The draw for the semi-finals was made on 3 July and ties were played 15 July.

Final
The final was played as a doubleheader at Warrington Wolves' Halliwell Jones stadium on Saturday 4 August 2018 along with the final of the challenge shield. In conjunction with broadcasters Proper Sport and BBC Sport the games were streamed live.

Teams: 
Castleford Tigers: 
Backs: Tara-Jane Stanley, Maisie Burton, Courtney Pointon, Lacey Owen, Kelsey Gentles, Georgie Hetherington, Olivia Grace, Lucy Eastwood 
Forwards: Lucy Eastwood, Sinaed Peach, Jasmine Rowley, Katie Hepworth (c), Beth Weir, Georgia Roche
Interchanges: Jasmine Cudjoe, Tamzin Renouf, Grace Field, Emma Lumley, Marie Colley, Katie Tordoff, Shannelle Mannion

Leeds Rhinos:
Backs: Charlotte Booth, Suze Hill, Sophie Nuttall, Sophie Robinson, Caitlin Beevers, Hanna Butcher, Courtney Hill
Forwards: Amy Johnson, Lois Forsell (c), Danielle Anderson, Aimee Staveley, Manina Spurr, Shannon Lacy
Interchanges: Frankie Townend, Madison Laverick, Chloe Kerrigan, Rhiannon Marshall, Ellie Oldroyd

Challenge Shield
The eight losing teams in the second round entered into a secondary competition, the Challenge Shield.  The Shield was won by Bradford Bulls who beat Stanningley 44–16.

Quarter-finals
Ties were played on 1 July.

Semi-finals
The draw was made on 3 July and the matches played on 15 July.

Final

Teams: 
Bradford Bulls: 
Backs: Leah Jones, Adara Telemacque, Savannah Andrade, Jess Courtman, Becky Conlon, Danielle Bose, Amy Boardman 
Forwards: Lauren Hickey, Chrissi Nettleton, Vicky Rhodes, Shona Hoyle, Heather McDonald, Reegan Walker 
Interchanges: Hayley Hields, Memphis Jubb, Stacey Greenwood, Stacey Wilson, Amy Hardcastle, Kirsty Maroney (c), Beth Sutcliffe

Stanningley: 
Backs: Hayley Fielding, Allana Walker, Sophie Bickerdyke, Elychia Watson, Lauren Waller, Chloe Wainwright-Morley, Laura Dyson 
Forwards: Rachael Barker, Grace Ramsden, Lyndsey Cunnett, Jodie Davies (c), Olivia Wood, Demi Fisher 
Interchanges: Markelle Morgan, Louise Travers, Loren Gregory, Leanne May

See also
 2018 Men's Challenge Cup

References

RFL Women's Challenge Cup
2018 in English rugby league
2018 in English women's sport
2018 in women's rugby league